Made in Medina is a studio album by French-Algerian raï artist Rachid Taha. It was released in 2000 by Barclay Records and produced and arranged by Steve Hillage. Five of the songs were subsequently featured in Taha's live album.

A video clip was made for "Hey Anta".

Critical reception
AllMusic wrote that "while it may sound like a shopping list for an international emporium, in fact, Medina has an extremely coherent sound, built on prominent, danceable rhythms, strong melodies, and powerful vocals, all shot through with a Middle Eastern flavor." The Washington Post called the album "an ecstatic union of Algerian rai and Western rock, techno and funk."

Track listing
"Barra Barra"  – 5:48
"Foqt Foqt"  – 6:10
"Medina" (album version)  – 5:39
"Ala Jalkoum"  – 4:55 - with Femi Kuti
"Aïe Aïe Aïe"  – 6:30
"Hey Anta"  – 4:30
"Qalantiqa"  – 5:22
"En Retard"  – 4:56
"Vérité"  – 6:06
"Ho Chérie Chérie"  – 5:30
"Garab"  – 8:19

Charts

Personnel
 Rachid Taha - lead vocals
 Abdel Abrit - drums
 Hakim Hamadouche - mandolute, backing vocals
 Steve Hillage - arranger, guitar, mixing, producer, programming, string arrangements 
 Femi Kuti - saxophone, vocals 
 Hassan Lachal - percussion
 Helen Liebmann - cello 
 Bob Loveday - violin 
 Robert Mercurio - bass
 Jean-Max Mery - keyboards
 Stanton Moore - drums
 Jeff Raines - guitar 
 Hossam Ramzy - percussion, string arrangements 
 Geoff Richardson - viola 
 Mahmoud Serour - string arrangements, violin 
 Richard Vogel - keyboards

References

External links
Official website

2000 albums
Albums produced by Steve Hillage
Rachid Taha albums